Sovići (Serbian Cyrillic: Cовићи) is a village in the Municipality of Grude in West Herzegovina Canton of the Federation of Bosnia and Herzegovina in Bosnia and Herzegovina.

Demographics 
According to the 1991 Yugoslav census, there were 2,629 residents in the village of Sovići, of which 2,625 were ethnic Croats.
According to the 2013 census, its population was 2,771.

Notable residents
Rafael Boban
Mate Boban

References

External links

Mjesna zajednica Sovići donji
Bobanova Draga
bratovština sv. Stjepana
Sovići Gornji

Villages in the Federation of Bosnia and Herzegovina
Populated places in Grude